Soetkin Van Deun (born 06 September 1988) is a former professional tennis player from Belgium. On 28 July 2008, she reached her highest WTA singles ranking of 528.

Her only WTA Tour main-draw appearance came at the Gaz de France Stars where she partnered Jessie de Vries in the doubles event. They lost in the first round to Luxembourgish Anne Kremer and French Virginie Razzano.

Received a degree in economics from KU Leuven university. She works in the accounting department of Ravago in Arendonk.

References

External links
 
 

1988 births
Living people
Belgian female tennis players
Sportspeople from Antwerp
KU Leuven alumni
21st-century Belgian women